Prince Rudolf Land, Crown Prince Rudolf Land, Prince Rudolf Island or Rudolf Island is the northernmost island of the Franz Josef Archipelago, Russia and is home to the northernmost point in Russia.

Owing to the island's location, its sheltered Teplitz Bay has served as a staging area for numerous polar expeditions.

History
The island was named by the Austro-Hungarian North Pole Expedition in honor of Archduke Rudolf (1858–1889), Crown Prince of Austria, Hungary and Bohemia. It belongs to the Arkhangelsk Oblast administrative region of the Russian Federation.

During the second International Polar Year, a weather station established on the island was the northernmost scientific outpost in the world.

Sheltered Teplitz Bay has been used as a stopping point for northbound ships. During 1899–1900, an expedition led by Prince Luigi Amedeo, Duke of the Abruzzi stopped in the area. The Ziegler Polar Expedition of 1903–1905, led by Anthony Fiala left a large hut here.

Owing to the steep terrain in Rudolf Island, the only airfield access is a small snow strip  up a glacier. It was constructed in 1936 as a staging area for the world's first drift ice station, North Pole-1.

Geography

Rudolf Island is almost completely glaciated. It is located very close to the limit of permanent Polar ice. The Middendorff Glacier (Lednik Middendorfa) covers the southeastern part of the island.

Cape Fligely, located on Rudolf Island's northern shore, is the northernmost point of Europe and Russia.

See also
 List of islands of Russia
 List of glaciers of Russia
 Queen Victoria Sea

References

Further reading

External links

 Images of buildings on the island (Flickr)

Islands of Franz Josef Land
Populated places of Arctic Russia
Rudolf, Crown Prince of Austria